The Thede Farmhouse is a historic farmhouse in Northglenn, Colorado, United States.  Built in 1903, it is a Queen Anne house.  Today, the brick farmhouse is surrounded by modern development.  In 1998, the house was listed on the National Register of Historic Places because of its well-preserved architecture.

See also
National Register of Historic Places listings in Adams County, Colorado

References

Houses completed in 1903
Houses in Adams County, Colorado
Houses on the National Register of Historic Places in Colorado
Queen Anne architecture in Colorado
National Register of Historic Places in Adams County, Colorado